Epsilon Pegasi (Latinised from ε Pegasi, abbreviated Epsilon Peg, ε Peg), formally named Enif , is the brightest star in the northern constellation of Pegasus. 

With an average apparent visual magnitude of 2.4, this is a second-magnitude star that is readily visible to the naked eye.

Nomenclature

ε Pegasi (Latinised to Epsilon Pegasi) is the star's Bayer designation.

It bore the traditional name Enif derived from the Arabic word for 'nose', due to its position as the muzzle of Pegasus. In 2016, the International Astronomical Union organized a Working Group on Star Names (WGSN) to catalog and standardize proper names for stars. The WGSN's first bulletin of July 2016 included a table of the first two batches of names approved by the WGSN; which included Enif for this star.

Other traditional names for the star include Fom al Feras, Latinised to Os Equi.

Physical characteristics
Epsilon Pegasi is a red supergiant star, as indicated by the stellar classification of K2 Ib. It is estimated to be seven times the Sun's mass. At the estimated distance of this star, this yields an enormous physical size of about 211 times the radius of the Sun. This temperature is cooler than the Sun, giving it the orange-hued glow of a K-type star.

Epsilon Pegasi is a slow irregular variable star that usually has a brightness between magnitudes 2.37 and 2.45.  However, it was once observed very briefly at magnitude 0.7, giving rise to the theory that it (and possibly other supergiants) erupt in massive flares that dwarf those of the Sun.  It has also been observed as faint as magnitude 3.5.

The spectrum shows an overabundance of the elements strontium and barium, which may be the result of the s-process of nucleosynthesis in the outer atmosphere of the star.

Evolution
Epsilon Pegasi has exhausted its core hydrogen and expanded away from the main sequence.  It is almost certainly on the horizontal branch fusing helium in its core.  It is sufficiently massive that it may die in a core-collapse supernova, or it may shed its outer layers and leave behind an unusual oxygen–neon white dwarf.

Pulfrich effect
Epsilon Pegasi is a fine example to observe the Pulfrich effect. This optical phenomenon is described on page 1372 of Burnham's Celestial Handbook. According to John Herschel: The apparent pendulum-like oscillation of a small star in the same vertical as the large one, when the telescope is swung from side to side.

See also
 List of brightest stars
 List of nearest bright stars
 Lists of stars
 Historical brightest stars

References

Pegasi, Epsilon
Pegasi, 08
K-type supergiants
Pegasus (constellation)
Enif
Slow irregular variables
8308
206778
107315
BD+09 4891
Horizontal-branch stars